ScaleBase was a company that sold software to implement distributed MySQL databases for cloud computing. The software company was located in the Boston, Massachusetts, area.

History
Scalebase was founded in 2009 by Doron Levari.  Ram Metser, formerly CEO of Guardium, a database security company acquired by IBM in 2009, was named as CEO in October 2012.
In October 2012, ScaleBase closed a Series B round of $10.5 million from Bain Capital Ventures, Ascent Venture Partners and its original investor, Cedar Fund.

ScaleArc raised $5.33 million in December 2011.
$12 million of new funding was announced  in January 2013 was led by Accell Partners.
The assets of ScaleBase were acquired by ScaleArc in August 2015.

Technology
The company ScaleBase provided two technology offerings: one was also called ScaleBase, and the other was Analysis Genie.

ScaleBase software  was first released in August 2011.

ScaleBase is a distributed database cluster built on MySQL. This capability provides the scalability and availability benefits of distributed database while retaining relational database characteristics.
 Two-phase commit and roll-back
 ACID compliance
 SQL query model, including cross-node joins and aggregations

ScaleBase data distribution is policy-based and transparent. That is, ScaleBase provides visibility and control of the variables that impact the data distribution policy.

ScaleBase software was available on Amazon Web Services (EC2, RDS), Rackspace, and IBM Cloud.

Analysis Genie was software as a service that analyzed schema and queries. Its purpose is to suggest a data distribution policy that is uniquely tuned for individual application requirements and database workloads.

References

External links
 

Software companies based in Massachusetts
NewSQL
Relational database management software for Linux
Defunct software companies of the United States